Allan Brodie may refer to:
Allan G. Brodie (1897–1976), American dentist and orthodontist
Allan Marshall Brodie, British historian
Allan Brodie (golfer) (born 1947), Scottish golfer